Aurel Rădulescu (13 October 1953 – 4 July 1979) was a Romanian football forward.

Club career

Aurel Rădulescu was born in on 13 October 1953 in Adamclisi into a large family where he was the youngest of five boys and later his family settled in Constanța. He started playing football on a field from the Brătianu neighborhood, afterwards playing on his school's field where he was seen by Farul Constanța's junior coach, Adam Munteanu who brought him to the club. Rădulescu made his Divizia A debut on 2 April 1972, playing for Farul in a 3–0 away loss against Steagul Roșu Brașov. After two seasons spent at Farul, he went to play for Sportul Studențesc București, a team where he spent 6 seasons, with a short interruption in 1974 when he was loaned at FC Galați. He played 146 Divizia A games in which he scored 26 goals, helped the team reach the 1979 Cupa României final which was lost with 3–0 in front of Steaua București, also appearing in 3 games in the 1976–77 UEFA Cup. He made his last Divizia A appearance on 24 June 1979, playing for Sportul Studențesc in a 1–0 away loss against Olimpia Satu Mare, having a total of 171 games and 28 goals scored in Divizia A. He died at age 25 while jumping out of a moving train in Hanover.

International career
Aurel Rădulescu played six games at international level for Romania, making his debut on 5 April 1978 under coach Ștefan Kovacs in a friendly which ended with a 2–0 loss against Argentina played on Estadio La Bombonera from Buenos Aires. He made a good impression in the game, being praised by journalist, Marius Popescu in the Sportul newspaper:"The first player that is a win for the national team - Rădulescu, from Sportul Studentesc. He leads the ball excellently, he is combative, he is technical, he is passionate, he wants to become a footballer of international level. If he will keep his seriousness, modesty, conscience to the games, he will get there!". He also played two matches at the Euro 1980 qualifiers. On 19 December 1978, Rădulescu made his last appearance at international level in a friendly which ended 1–1 against Israel.

Honours
FC Galați
Divizia B: 1973–74
Sportul Studențesc București
Cupa României runner-up: 1978–79

References

External links

1953 births
1979 deaths
Romanian footballers
Romania under-21 international footballers
Romania international footballers
Association football forwards
Liga I players
Liga II players
FCV Farul Constanța players
FC Sportul Studențesc București players
FCM Dunărea Galați players
Railway accident deaths in Germany